Lissochlamys is a genus of scallops, marine bivalve molluscs in the family Pectinidae, the scallops. Species within this genus have a West African and Northern Mediterranean distribution.

The fossil record of this species dates back to the Pliocene (age range: 3.6 to 2.588 million years ago).

Species
Species within the genus Lissochlamys include:
 Lissochlamys exotica  (L.W. Dillwyn, 1817)

References

 Ardovini, R.; Cossignani, T. (2004). West African seashells (including Azores, Madeira and Canary Is.) = Conchiglie dell'Africa Occidentale (includes Azzorre, Madeira e Canarie). English-Italian edition. L'Informatore Piceno: Ancona, Italy. . 319 pp.

Pectinidae
Bivalve genera